Women's long jump events for amputee athletes were held at the 2004 Summer Paralympics in the Athens Olympic Stadium. Events were held in two disability classes.



F42

The F42 event was won by Zhang Hai Yuan, representing .

20 Sept. 2004, 19:45

F44/46

The F44/46 event was won by Andrea Scherney, representing .

20 Sept. 2004, 10:30

References

W
2004 in women's athletics